In Sodavid (born 2 July 1998) is a Cambodian footballer who plays for Phnom Penh Crown in the Cambodian League and the Cambodia national football team.

Club career
Sodavid signed his first professional contract with Phnom Penh Crown in 2015 and made his first appearance on 26 September. During his first professional season, he made 6 appearances with 2 goals and helped his club to win sixth title.

International career
He made his international debut in a Friendly Match against Sri Lanka on 9 October 2016.

Honours

Club
Phnom Penh Crown
Cambodian League: 2015

References

External links
 

1998 births
Living people
Cambodian footballers
Cambodia international footballers
Sportspeople from Phnom Penh
Association football midfielders
Phnom Penh Crown FC players
Competitors at the 2017 Southeast Asian Games
Competitors at the 2019 Southeast Asian Games
Southeast Asian Games competitors for Cambodia
Visakha FC players
Cambodian Premier League players